Howard Schuman (1928 - 2021) was an American sociologist and professor of sociology at the University of Michigan. He is known for his work on survey research, such as the design of polling questions.

Education and career
Schuman received his A.B. from Antioch College in philosophy in 1953, his M.S. in psychology from Trinity University in 1956, and his Ph.D. in sociology from Harvard University in 1961. He joined the faculty of the University of Michigan in 1964 as an assistant professor, and became a full professor there in 1971. From 1982 to 1990, he directed the Survey Research Center at the University of Michigan's Institute for Social Research. He retired from his positions at the University of Michigan in 1996; he has been an emeritus professor at the University of Michigan and an emeritus research scientist at their Survey Research Center until 2021. In 2017, Schuman received the Warren J. Mitofsky Award for Excellence in Public Opinion Research from the board of directors of the Roper Center for Public Opinion Research at Cornell University.

Research
Schuman has researched many topics in the field of survey research, including public opinion on whether Christopher Columbus discovered America, reported incidents of police abuse in major U.S. cities, and the relationship between studying and grades.

Professional affiliations
Schuman has been a fellow of the Society of Personality and Social Psychology since 1991, of the Association for Psychological Science since 2004, and of the American Academy of Arts and Sciences since 1993.

References

External links
Schuman's faculty page

1928 births
Living people
University of Michigan faculty
American sociologists
Fellows of the Association for Psychological Science
Fellows of the American Academy of Arts and Sciences
Antioch College alumni
Trinity University (Texas) alumni
Harvard University alumni